Diocese of Marsabit may refer to:

 One of the Anglican dioceses of Mount Kenya
 Roman Catholic Diocese of Marsabit